The Men's 10 km competition at the 2019 World Aquatics Championships was held on 16 July 2019.

Results
The race was started at 08:00.

References

Men's 10 km